G. Chockalingam (died 20 April 2000), was an Indian politician and a Member of the Legislative Assembly. He was elected to the Tamil Nadu legislative assembly as a Dravida Munnetra Kazhagam (DMK) candidate from Tirupporur constituency in the 1996 election. The constituency was reserved for candidates from the Scheduled Castes. He had also been elected from the constituency in 1977 and 1980.

Chockalingam died on 20 April 2000, aged 63. He was survived by his wife, three sons and two daughters.

References 

He was a brave and truthful man.His three sons were G.C.Kathiravan,G.C.Anbuchezian,G.C.Selvam and two daughters are G.C.kavitha,G.C.Selvi .His memorial place is located in Mambakkam.

2000 deaths
Dravida Munnetra Kazhagam politicians
Tamil Nadu MLAs 1996–2001
Year of birth missing